Leyva is of Spanish origin. It is a variant of Leiva.

Leyva is a surname. Notable people with the surname include:

People
 Ricardo Leyva Muñoz Ramírez (1960–2013), American serial killer, rapist, and burglar

Middle name 

Edgardo Leyva Escandon, Mexican national and career criminal
Herman Leyva Marques (1934–2006), professional boxer

Family name 

Alfredo Beltrán Leyva (born 1960), incarcerated Mexican drug lord with the Beltrán-Leyva Cartel
Arturo Beltrán Leyva (1961–2009), the leader of the Mexico drug trafficking organization known as the Beltrán-Leyva Cartel
Brother Tony Leyva (1946–2005), Pentecostal preacher and convicted pederast and child molester
Bryan Leyva, Mexican footballer who currently plays for Major League Soccer club FC Dallas
Diego Lainez Leyva, (born 2000) Mexican national footballer
Carlos Beltrán Leyva (born 1969), incarcerated Mexican drug lord with the Beltrán-Leyva Cartel
Danell Leyva (born 1991), Cuban-American gymnast
Fátima Leyva (born 1980), Mexican footballer
Héctor Beltrán Leyva, Mexican drug lord and leader of the Beltrán Leyva Cartel
James Andrew Leyva (born 1991), American drag queen known as Valentina
Mario René Díaz Leyva (born 1951), Cuban photographer
Nick Leyva (born 1953), the current third base coach of the Pittsburgh Pirates
Pío Leyva (1917–2006), Cuban singer and the author of the well-known guaracha El Mentiroso
Roberto Carlos Leyva (born 1979), Mexican boxer in the Bantamweight division
Fashawn (born 1988), Given name Santiago Leyva, an American Rapper
Teresa Leyva (born 1965), Colombian chess player
Victor Leyva (born 1977), Mexican guard in American football, who is currently a free agent

de Leyva
Antonio de Leyva, Duke of Terranova (1480–1536), Spanish general during the Italian Wars
Diego de Leyva (1580–1637), Spanish painter
Juan de Leyva de la Cerda, conde de Baños (1604–1678), Spanish nobleman and viceroy of New Spain
Marianna de Leyva y Marino, The Nun of Monza, (1575–1650), Italian nun
Sinaloa de Leyva, city in the Mexican state of Sinaloa
Villa de Leyva, colonial town and municipality, in the Boyacá department of Colombia, part of the subregion of the Ricaurte Province

y Leyva
Diego de Covarubias y Leyva (1512–1577), Spanish jurist and bishop of Segovia

Others
Beltrán-Leyva Cartel, Mexican drug cartel and organized crime syndicate founded by the four Beltrán Leyva brothers: Marcos Arturo, Carlos, Alfredo and Héctor

See also
Leiva (disambiguation)

References

Spanish-language surnames